Piotr Skierski (born 30 December 1971) is a Polish table tennis player. He competed in the men's singles event at the 1992 Summer Olympics.

References

1971 births
Living people
Polish male table tennis players
Olympic table tennis players of Poland
Table tennis players at the 1992 Summer Olympics
People from Rybnik